The 2021 Georgian local elections were held on 2 and 30 October to elect the bodies of local government of Georgia.

Background

19 April agreement

On 19 April, 2021, the ruling Georgian Dream party and the opposition signed an agreement, which ended a six-month political crisis stemming from the contested  2020 parliamentary elections. The agreement stipulated snap parliamentary elections if the Georgian Dream party would garner less than 43% of the vote in the October 2021 local elections. It also envisaged a change in the electoral system at the local level: 4:1 proportion of proportional and majoritarian seats in five major cities and 2:1 proportion in all others. At the same time, a 3% threshold was set in the proportional system in the regions and a 2.5% threshold in Tbilisi. The 40% demand was set in the majoritarian system. The Georgian Parliament adopted relevant amendments to the Election Code on June 28, 2021.

Most parties signed the agreement, and elected opposition MPs took up their parliamentary mandates which they had refused until then. However, the largest opposition party United National Movement refused to join the agreement, which later led to Georgian Dream withdrawing from the agreement two months before the October 2021 local elections. According to the head of the Georgian Dream party Irakli Kobakhidze, the agreement "failed to accomplish its goals" because of the UNM's refusal to join it.

Arrest of Mikheil Saakashvili

Former President of Georgia Mikheil Saakashvili, who left Georgia in 2013  and was condemned by the Tbilisi City Court to six years in prison in absentia for abuse of power, embezzlement, and his implication in the attempted murder of an opposition MP, announced his return to Georgia on 1 October 2021, on the eve of the local elections. Saakashvili went live on Facebook and called on his followers to march on the capital, Tbilisi. Some government officials initially denied Saakashvili's arrival and said that he was in Ukraine. However, later on the same day Prime Minister of Georgia Irakli Garibashvili held press briefing, where he announced that Saakashvili was arrested in Tbilisi. According to the investigation, Saakashvili entered the country secretly, hiding in a semi-trailer truck loaded with milk products. He illegally crossed the state border of Georgia, bypassing the customs control.

Electoral system 

Local self-government is the right and ability of citizens of Georgia to solve, within the legislation of Georgia, local issues through local authorities elected by them. There are two types of self-governing units (municipalities): self-governing cities and self-governing communities. A self-governing city is a settlement of an urban category, while a self-governing community is an aggregation of several settlements with administrative boundaries and an administrative center. There are 5 self-governing cities and 59 self-governing communities. Self-governing cities are Tbilisi, Kutaisi, Batumi, Rustavi, Poti. The representative bodies (a representative council, in Georgian Sakrebulo) and a mayor, the head of the executive bodies, are directly elected by the citizens of Georgia registered in a self-governing unit to a four-year term. Members of Sakrebulos of the self-governing communities and the self-governing cities are elected through the majoritarian and proportional electoral systems. The election date is appointed by the President of Georgia 60 days prior to the polls and countersigned by Prime Minister.

The Annex No. 1 to the сurrent Election Code regulates the compositions of Sakrebulos of self-governing communities and self-governing cities, except the Tbilisi Sakrebulo, which is composed of 50 members, out of which 10 members are elected in the territory of local single-seat majoritarian electoral districts, and 40 are elected through the proportional electoral system in the whole territory of Tbilisi municipality.

Compositions of Sakrebulos of self-governing communities and self-governing cities (except for Tbilisi City) according to the Annex No. 1 to the Election Code:

2021 Tbilisi mayoral election 

The 2021 Tbilisi mayoral election (Georgian: თბილისის მერის არჩევნები) was held on 2 and 30 October 2021 to elect the Mayor of Tbilisi in parallel to the Tbilisi City Sakrebulo elections.

The main candidates for the mayoral election were Kakha Kaladze, the incumbent Mayor of Tbilisi and former Minister of Energy from the ruling Georgian Dream party, Nika Melia, Member of Parliament from the United National Movement, and Giorgi Gakharia, former Prime Minister and Minister of Internal Affairs from the recently established For Georgia party.

In total, 16 candidates were nominated for the Tbilisi mayoral election.

Opinion polls

Results 

 denotes a self-governing city.

See also 
 Administrative divisions of Georgia (country)
 Local government in Georgia (country)
 Tbilisi City Assembly
 Batumi City Assembly
 Kutaisi City Assembly
 Poti City Assembly
 Rustavi City Assembly

References 

Local
Local elections in Georgia (country)
Georgia
Georgia